Moira pottery works, founded in 1922, was known for its utilitarian stoneware crocks for marmalade and inexpensive pitchers and other kitchen wares, sometimes applied with transfer-printed advertising reproducing quaint turn-of-the-century woodcuts. The company's "Hillstonia" ware was intended for forcing bulbs and containing plants.

Moira pottery was often marked with an oval stamp on the unglazed undersides of its production. The pottery works was situated approximately 5 mi (8 km) from Burton-on-Trent, Staffordshire, although the village of Moira is just over the border in Leicestershire.

The plant was closed by the National Coal Board and its buildings razed in 1972 under compulsory purchase, because the land it stood on was over a coal reserve. After the open-pit coal seam was exhausted the land was reclaimed and is planted as part of the National Forest.

Ceramics manufacturers of England
Design companies established in 1922
Manufacturing companies established in 1922
1922 establishments in England
Manufacturing companies disestablished in 1972
1972 disestablishments in England